Manuel P. Del Rosario (July 1, 1915 – March 23, 2009) was a Filipino prelate of the Roman Catholic Church. At the time of his death, Del Rosario was the oldest Filipino bishop and one of the oldest Catholic bishops. He was succeeded by Manuel Sobreviñas, D.D., Bishop-Emeritus of Imus as the oldest Filipino living bishop and oldest to die at the age of 96 in 2020.

Biography
Del Rosario was born in Baao, Camarines Sur (then a part of Ambos Camarines), Philippines in 1915, and was ordained a priest on March 25, 1939. He was appointed Coadjutor Bishop of the Diocese of Calbayog and appointed Titular bishop of Zerta on May 24, 1955, and was ordained a bishop on July 25, 1955. He succeeded to bishop of Calbayog on July 25, 1958, and was later appointed to bishop of the newly created Diocese of Malolos on December 11, 1961, and installed as ordinary on March 11, 1962. He also founded the Immaculate Conception Seminary in Tabe, Guiguinto. In 1963, Del Rosario suffered a stroke while attending the Second Vatican Council  in Rome, leaving him paralyzed and using a wheelchair. Del Rosario resigned as bishop of Malolos due to health reasons on December 15, 1977, and was succeeded by Bishop Cirilo Almario. He died of pneumonia in March 2009.

See also
Roman Catholic Diocese of Malolos
Roman Catholic Diocese of Calbayog

References

External links

1915 births
2009 deaths
20th-century Roman Catholic bishops in the Philippines
Deaths from pneumonia in the Philippines
People from Camarines Sur